Aliabad-e Bar Aftab (also Romanized as ‘Alīābād-e Bar Āftāb; also known as ‘Alīābād-e Mīrākhūr and ‘Alīābād) is a village in Qalayi Rural District, Firuzabad District, Selseleh County, Lorestan Province, Iran. At the 2006 census, its population was 40, in 8 families.

References 

Towns and villages in Selseleh County